Enginalan (Kurdish: Pilûr, Armenian: Բլուր, romanized: Blur ), is a köy (village) in the Iğdır central district of Iğdır Province, Turkey.

History 
From the records of 1901 and 1928 we know the village was once called Blur in Armenian, which means mound.

Enginalan was an Armenian inhabited settlement prior to the Armenian-Turkish war in 1920, with a population of 2,244 in 1908

Population 
As of 2020, the town had a population of 2,498.

References

Populated places in Iğdır Province
Towns in Turkey
Iğdır Central District
Kurdish settlements in Turkey

Former Armenian inhabited settlements